Artem Oleksiyovych Bloshenko (born 1 February 1985) is a Ukrainian heavyweight judoka who competed at the 2012 and 2016 Olympics.

Bloshenko graduated from Donetsk State Institute of Health, Physical Education and Sport. He is married to Ekaterina and has a son Maxim. His elder brother Andrei is also a competitive judoka.

References

External links

 
 
 
 

1985 births
Living people
Ukrainian male judoka
Olympic judoka of Ukraine
Judoka at the 2012 Summer Olympics
Judoka at the 2016 Summer Olympics
Sportspeople from Donetsk
European Games competitors for Ukraine
Judoka at the 2015 European Games